Senior Series Lacrosse is a Senior C box lacrosse league based out of Ontario, Canada sanctioned by the Ontario Lacrosse Association. SSL teams compete for the Nobile Cup (named after league founder Shelly Nobile) league championship.

History
Formed in 2019, Senior Series Lacrosse was formed to fill a void between Senior B (full-contact, very competitive) and Masters (non-contact) box lacrosse. Senior Series Lacrosse offers players an opportunity to continue playing competitive full-contact lacrosse after Junior without the time commitment of Senior A or B levels. SSL play modified CLA rules with games taking place at a single site over a weekend. Playing multiple games on the same day, teams play two 20-minute halves instead of three periods.

Five teams (Huntsville Hawks, Lakefield Rage, London Blue Devils, Peel Region Tigers, Six Nations Tomahawks) competed in the inaugural season playing 14 games over four weekends. Teams are seeded with the four top teams advancing to the league playoffs.

The league expanded to seven in 2020 with the addition of North Bay Titans and Toronto Lightning. Prior to the 2022 season Khaos Lacrosse Club and Wellington Aces were added to the circuit.

Teams

Champions

References

External links
Senior Series Lacrosse website

Ontario Masters Lacrosse Association MastersLacrosseAssociationofOntario.ca

Ontario Lacrosse Association OntarioLacrosse.com

Ontario Lacrosse Association
Lacrosse leagues in Canada
Sports leagues established in 2019
2019 establishments in Ontario